The Central University of Jharkhand (CUJ) is a central university located in Ranchi, Jharkhand, India. It was established in 2009.

History
CUJ was established in 2009 under the first schedule of the Central Universities Act, 2009. The first and founding Vice Chancellor (VC), Darlando Khathing, was appointed 1 March 2009. Consequent upon culmination of his tenure in March 2014, he was replaced by acting vice chancellor A.N. Misra. Prof. Misra served as acting VC until the appointment of Nand Kumar Yadav Indu as permanent VC in August 2015. On completion of his term, Prof. Ratan Kumar Dey served as the acting VC for almost a year. Currently, Prof. Kshiti Bhusan Das is heading the university.

Campus
The Brambe campus includes 70 independent class rooms and teaching labs, a 450-seat auditorium, research lab complex for sciences, engineering workshops, computer lab, and a linguistics lab. The university provides on-campus accommodation to students (total capacity 1000 boys and girls in separate hostels).

Organisation and administration

Schools and departments
The schools and departments under the Central University of Jharkhand are.

School of Humanities and Social Sciences
 Department of Politics and International Relations
 Department of Public Administration

 School of Mass Communication and Media Technologies
 Department of Mass Communication

School of Natural Sciences
 Department of Chemistry
 Department of Physics
 Department of Life Sciences
 Department of Mathematics
 Department of Computer Science and Technology

School of Languages
 Department of English Studies
 Department of Hindi
 Department of Far East Languages (Korean, Chinese, Tibetan)

School of Engineering and Technology
 Department of Nano Science and Technology
 Department of Energy Engineering
 Department of Transport Science and Technology
 Centre for Excellence-Green and Efficient Energy Technology (CoE-GEET)
 Department of Water Engineering and Management

School for the Study of Culture
 Department of Anthropology and Tribal Studies
 Department of Contemporary and Tribal Customary Law
 Department of Performing Arts

School of Natural Resource Management
 Department of Environmental Sciences
 Department of Geo-informatics
 Department of Geography

School of Management Sciences
 Department of Business Administration
 Department of Commerce and Financial Studies

School of Education
 Department of Education

Academics
CUJ offers Masters Program in more than 20 disciplines, teacher training program (B.Ed.) and Ph.D. programs. As of now these programs are offered at the temporary campus of the university  located at Brambe, a 25 km drive from Ranchi (Capital of Jharkhand state in India) railway station.

Admission
Admission to the M.Sc./M.Tech/M.Com /M.B.A./M.A./ B.Ed. and Ph.D. programs are based on the Common University Entrance Test (CUET).

References

9.High Court of Jharkhand Judgement regarding awarding of unspecified degree
Mausam Kumar vs The Union Of India on 20 July, 2018

External links
 

Central universities in India
Universities in Jharkhand
Educational institutions established in 2009
2009 establishments in Jharkhand